David Wenham  (born 21 September 1965) is an Australian actor who has appeared in film, television and theatre. He is known for his roles as Faramir in The Lord of the Rings film trilogy, Friar Carl in Van Helsing, Dilios in 300 and its sequel 300: Rise of an Empire,  Al Parker in Top of the Lake, Lieutenant John Scarfield in Pirates of the Caribbean: Dead Men Tell No Tales, and Hank Snow in Elvis. He is known in his native Australia for his role as Diver Dan in SeaChange and Price Galese in Les Norton.

Early life
Wenham was born on 21 September 1965 in Marrickville, New South Wales, the son of Kath and Bill Wenham. He has five older sisters; Helen, Anne, Carmel, Kathryn, and Maree; and one older brother, Peter. He was raised in the Roman Catholic faith and attended Christian Brothers' High School, Lewisham, Sydney.

Career
Wenham started his career as an actor after graduating from Theatre Nepean at the University of Western Sydney with a Bachelor of Arts (Performing Arts) in 1987. Wenham's television credits include several telefilms, such as his AFI award-winning role in 1997's Simone de Beauvoir's Babies; and his role as the outwardly laid back but deeply enigmatic diver Dan Della Bosca in the 1998 and 1999 seasons of the ABC television series SeaChange. His role as "Diver Dan" has made the actor something of a sex symbol, although he dislikes thinking of himself as such, and he has been voted Australia's "sexiest man alive". A portrait of Wenham by artist Adam Cullen won the Archibald Prize in 2000.

Australian films Wenham has starred in include The Boys (1998) based on the play of the same name premiered at Griffin Theatre Company and in turn based on the murder of Anita Cobby; Molokai (1999), based on the life of Father Damien; The Bank (2001); Gettin' Square (2003); Stiff (2004); The Brush-Off (2004) and Three Dollars (2005). Wenham has periodically appeared in Hollywood films; he is known for playing Faramir, son of Denethor II, in New Line Cinema's The Lord of the Rings: The Two Towers and The Lord of the Rings: The Return of the King.

He was seen in Van Helsing playing Hugh Jackman's sidekick, Friar Carl. His character, Dilios, narrated and appeared in the 2007 film 300. He reprises his role of Dilios in both the 2014 sequel, 300: Rise of an Empire and the video game, 300: March to Glory for Sony PlayStation Portable, which contains a substantial amount of new dialogue. Minor roles of Wenham's in overseas films include in The Crocodile Hunter as a park ranger, and briefly in Moulin Rouge! as Audrey. Wenham stars in the music video for Alex Lloyd's single "Brand New Day". In 2008's Australia, he reunited with Hugh Jackman playing antagonist Neil Fletcher.

In 2009, he appeared in Public Enemies as one of John Dillinger's men. He also returned to the stage, this time as the lead actor, Jerry Springer, in the British musical Jerry Springer: The Opera. During its 6-day run at the Sydney Opera House he played in sold-out performances alongside ARIA award-winning singer Kate Miller-Heidke.

In 2010, he played the character  'Len' in the Australian drama film Oranges and Sunshine. Also in 2010, Wenham starred as the disgraced Melbourne lawyer Andrew Fraser in the Australian television series Killing Time. This ten-part series shows Fraser's fall from grace as he defends many Melbourne criminals during the 1980s and 1990s. It was shown on TV1 in late 2011.

Wenham plays New Zealand detective Al Parker alongside Elisabeth Moss in the 2013 BBC series Top of the Lake.

In 2013, Wenham returned to the stage to play the lead role of John Proctor, in the Melbourne Theatre Company's mid-year production of Arthur Miller's The Crucible.

In 2014, Wenham starred as Patrick Jones in Paper Planes, released on 15 January 2015. That same year, Wenham voiced the role Jacko a frilled-neck lizard, in Blinky Bill the Movie. In 2016, Wenham played the role of John, the adoptive father of Saroo Brierley in Lion.

Wenham played the role of the villain Harold Meachum in the Netflix original television series Iron Fist, which premiered in March 2017.

In 2018, Wenham plays the voice of Johnny Town-Mouse in Peter Rabbit, a role he reprised in the 2021 sequel Peter Rabbit 2: The Runaway.

In 2020, it was announced that Wenham was cast as Jasper Queller in the upcoming Netflix thriller series Pieces of Her, which is adapted from the Karin Slaughter novel of the same name.

In 2022, Wenham returned to work with director Baz Luhrmann again to play the role of country singer Hank Snow in the biographical film Elvis.

In November 2022, Wenham played Scrooge in a production of A Christmas Carol, his performance was praised as showing Scrooge as traumatised.

He was appointed a Member of the Order of Australia in the 2023 Australia Day Honours.

Personal life
Wenham has two daughters with his longtime partner, Kate Agnew.

He read a poem by Rupert McCall at the memorial service for Steve Irwin. The poem was entitled "The Crocodiles are Crying".

Wenham is a Sydney Swans supporter.

Filmography

Film

Television

Video games

Awards and nominations
 Australian Film Institute Award for Best Lead Actor in Television Drama for Simone de Beauvoir's Babies (1997) – winner
Australian Film Institute Award for Best Lead Actor in Television Drama for Answered by Fire (2006) – winner
 Saturn Award for Best Supporting Actor for 300 (2007) - nominated

References

External links

 
 Urban Cinefile
 

1965 births
Living people
Members of the Order of Australia
20th-century Australian male actors
21st-century Australian male actors
AACTA Award winners
Australian male film actors
Australian male soap opera actors
Australian male stage actors
Australian male television actors
Australian male voice actors
Male actors from Sydney
Outstanding Performance by a Cast in a Motion Picture Screen Actors Guild Award winners
People from Marrickville
Western Sydney University alumni
Blinky Bill